Barruecopardo is a village and municipality in the province of Salamanca,  western Spain, part of the autonomous community of Castile-Leon.

The postal code is 37255. Barruecopardo mine is a tungsten mine in the vicinity.

References

Municipalities in the Province of Salamanca